The Rathskeller (known as The Rat)  was a  live music venue in Boston that was open from 1974 to 1997.  It was considered the "granddaddy" of Boston rock venues.

During its heyday, the Rat hosted such acts as the Cars, the Pixies, Metallica, Dead Kennedys, the Ramones, Talking Heads, R.E.M., Dinosaur Jr., The Replacements,  the Police, and Soundgarden. From 1980 to 1987, The Hoodoo BBQ, which Esquire called one of the "100 Best Restaurants in America"—was located at The Rat.

In the 1960s the Rat was a restaurant and bar catering to college students. At the time, it offered live music in a back room, featuring local bands such as the Remains (who opened for the Beatles on their final tour), the Lost (with future Boston punk legend Willie "Loco" Alexander) and The Mods (whose drummer Harry Sandler went on to play with "Boston Sound" hitmakers Orpheus). The Remains were so popular in 1965 the owner of the Rathskeller was forced to open up the basement for the overflow crowds that the Remains attracted.  Live music was phased out in the late 1960s, returning in 1974.

The "locus of boston rock and roll," the Rat was noted for the artists who performed there before their commercial breakthroughs and the local bands and scenes it helped to develop. In 1976, the album Live at The Rat was released; it documented the music of the time as well as the importance of the club in the development of Boston rock and roll. The WBCN Rock & Roll Rumble was held at the Rat for its first three years and was originally referred to as "The Rumble at the Rat."

The Rat was  also considered important for its contribution to the Hardcore movement. In a 2010 interview, Ken Casey of the Dropkick Murphys said: "(The Rat) afforded us the opportunity to have a place to play and develop our fan base, and it was just amazing to us. And the reason I credit it with all of our success, was this is how we started to tour. The hardcore punk scene in the mid-’90s was huge in Boston."

References to the Rat's cultural impact can be found in the book All Souls, The Sound of Our Town, the film All Ages: The Boston Hardcore Film, and in both Guitar Hero II and Guitar Hero Encore: Rocks the 80s.

The Rathskeller closed in November 1997, and was torn down in October 2000 to make way for the Hotel Commonwealth, a 148-room luxury hotel of which Boston University is a limited partner.

The band Camper Van Beethoven, pejoratively referenced the club in their 1988 song "Never Go Back" ("Never going to go back to the Rat and play another mafia show again").

In 2002, The Mighty Mighty Bosstones released a song on their album A Jackknife to a Swan lamenting the loss of the Rat titled "I Want My City Back."

Notable acts

311
8-Eyed Spy
AxCx
Aerosmith
Agent Orange
Agnostic Front
GG Allin and the Jabbers
Angry Samoans
Alex Chilton
The Alley Cats
Anti-Flag
The Atlantics
Aus-Rotten
B-52s
Bad Brains
Bastel
The Beastie Boys
Big Black
Big D & the Kids Table
Black Cat Bone
Black Flag
Blitzkrieg
Blondie
Blotto
Boys Life
Buffalo Tom
Bullet LaVolta
Mr. Butch
Butthole Surfers
Camper Van Beethoven
The Cars
The Casualties
Celibate Rifles
Crocodile Shop
Crash Worship
D Generation
Dag Nasty
The Damned
Dead Boys
Dead Kennedys
The dB's
Del Fuegos
The Delinquents
Dervish
The Descendents
Destroy!
Destroy All Monsters
Dinosaur Jr.
DMZ
The Dogmatics
Dream Syndicate
Dropdead
Dropkick Murphys
Dumptruck
DYS
Ed's Redeeming Qualities
The Effigies
English Beat
The Fall
Fishbone
The Flesh Eaters
The Fleshtones
Flipper
The Flying Lizards
Foetus
The F.U.'s
The Freeze
Game Theory
Gang Green
The Godfathers
Godsmack
The Go-Gos
Goo Goo Dolls
Gorilla Biscuits
Harlequin
The Heartbreakers
Henry Rollins
Hole
Holly and the Italians
Human Sexual Response
Thee Hypnotics
Hüsker Dü
Inside Out
Chris Isaak
The J. Geils Band (Peter Wolf)
The Jam
Jerry's Kids
Joan Jett and the Blackhearts
Joe Ely
The Joe Perry Project
John Cale
La Peste
Los Lobos
Lou Miami
Lyres
Aimee Mann
Mazzy Star
Megadeth
The Melvins
Metallica
The Mighty Mighty Bosstones
Miltown
Mink DeVille
Minutemen
Mission of Burma
Mother Love Bone
Napalm Death
The Neats
Nervous Eaters
November Group
Only Living Witness
Orbit
The Outlets
Patti Smith
People in Stores
The Plasmatics
Poison
Powerman 5000
Pixies
The Police
The Queers
Quiet Riot
Rain Parade
The Ramones
The Real Kids
The Real McKenzies
Redd Kross
Red Hot Chili Peppers
The Replacements
The Remains
R.E.M.
Richard Hell
Rick James
Robin Lane and the Chartbusters
Robyn Hitchcock
Rogue
Roy Buchanan
The Runaways
SS Decontrol
SNFU
Salem 66
Sam Black Church
Scruffy The Cat
Sheer Terror
Showcase Showdown
Sick of It All
Slapshot
Slash
The Smithereens
Social Distortion
Sonic Youth
Soul Asylum
Soundgarden
Steve Earle
Stevie Ray Vaughan
The Stompers
The Stranglers
Straw Dogs
Suicide
Talking Heads
Thin Lizzy
Throwing Muses
'Til Tuesday
Tom Petty
Translator
True West
Tuff Darts
The Unseen
U2
The Ben Vaughn Combo
Volcano Suns
Wargasm
The Washington Squares
White Zombie
Willie "Loco" Alexander
The Wipers
Wrathchild
Wu-Tang Clan
Young Snakes
Youth Brigade
Zero Boys
The Zulus

References

External links
"The Rat Remembered: 8 True (and Terrifying) Stories from Boston’s Legendary Rock Club" - Rockerzine.com 2016

Culture of Boston
Music venues in Boston
Nightclubs in Massachusetts
Former music venues in the United States
Demolished music venues in the United States
Punk rock venues
Drinking establishments in Boston
1974 establishments in Massachusetts
1997 disestablishments in Massachusetts
Buildings and structures demolished in 2000
Demolished buildings and structures in Massachusetts